The 1994 Stanley Cup Finals was the championship series of the National Hockey League's (NHL) 1993–94 season, and the culmination of the 1994 Stanley Cup playoffs. It was contested between the Eastern Conference champion New York Rangers and Western Conference champion Vancouver Canucks. The Rangers ended their record 54-year championship drought with a victory in game seven to claim the long-awaited Stanley Cup. It was the fourth championship in franchise history. The CBC broadcast of the deciding game seven attracted an average Canadian audience of 4.957 million viewers, making it the most watched CBC Sports program in history to that time. This was the last Stanley Cup Finals with games played in Canada until 2004, and the last to go the full seven games until 2001.

Paths to the Finals

The Canucks entered the playoffs seeded seventh in the Western Conference, and overcame a three-games-to-one deficit against the Calgary Flames, winning the final three games in overtime with game seven ending in double overtime as Pavel Bure scored the winning goal on a breakaway to upset the Flames. They then upset the fourth-seeded Dallas Stars and the third-seeded Toronto Maple Leafs in five games each to capture the Western Conference title.

The Rangers entered the playoffs with the league's best record, then swept their New York-area rival New York Islanders and then beat the Washington Capitals in five games, before falling behind three games to two in the Eastern Conference Finals against their Hudson River rivals, New Jersey Devils. They then won game six by a 4–2 score after team captain Mark Messier publicly guaranteed a victory and then scored a third-period hat trick. The Rangers then won game seven 2–1 on Stephane Matteau's goal in double overtime, prompting the call of "Matteau, Matteau, Matteau!" by Rangers radio announcer Howie Rose. It was Matteau's second double overtime goal of the series.

Game summaries
This series brought together two assistant coaches who were teammates on the other Canucks team to reach the Finals: Rangers assistant coach Colin Campbell and Canucks assistant coach Stan Smyl, who served as team captain then, as Kevin McCarthy was injured.

It was the second straight Finals that featured a former Edmonton Oilers captain trying to become the first person to win a Stanley Cup as captain on two different teams. The previous year, Wayne Gretzky, who captained the Oilers to the first four of their five Stanley Cups in the 1980s, captained the Los Angeles Kings to the finals, which they lost to the Montreal Canadiens.

The Rangers players had a decided edge in Finals experience, with seven players from the 1990 Oilers, including Messier, Glenn Anderson, Jeff Beukeboom, Adam Graves, Kevin Lowe, Craig MacTavish, and Esa Tikkanen. One 1990 Oiler, Martin Gelinas, was playing for the Canucks. Overall, the Rangers had eleven players with previous Finals appearances, compared to the Canucks' five. In addition, three of the Rangers (Messier, Anderson, and Lowe) were each making their seventh appearance in the Stanley Cup Finals (each having made their first six with Edmonton).

With the Rangers having 112 points in the regular-season standing and the Canucks 85, the 27-point difference was the largest point differential between two teams in the Stanley Cup Finals since 1982, when there was a 41-point difference between the New York Islanders (118) and the Canucks (77).

Game one

The Rangers scored early and led 2–1 late in the third period before Martin Gélinas tied the game with 1:00 to play in regulation time. It was the third time in eight games that the Rangers had surrendered a last-minute tying goal. The Rangers were all over the Canucks in overtime, but goaltender Kirk McLean made 52 saves on the night. In the last minute of the first overtime, Brian Leetch hit the crossbar at one end, and the Canucks went down to score the winner at the other on an odd-man rush by Greg Adams, as the Rangers, once again, lost a series opener at home in overtime.

Game two

The Rangers evened the series with a 3–1 victory before the series shifted west.

Game three

The Canucks came storming out in front of their home fans and Pavel Bure scored on his first shift to give them the early lead. But late in the period, with the score tied 1–1, Bure hit Jay Wells in the face with his stick and cut him, leading to a major penalty and Bure's expulsion from the game. Alexei Kovalev scored a breakaway shorthanded goal, which was featured on the cover of NHL 95. Glenn Anderson scored on the ensuing power-play and the Rangers then cruised to a 5–1 victory.

Game four

In the fourth game, the Canucks again jumped out to an early lead, this time 2–0, before Mike Richter and Brian Leetch took over the game. Richter made some key saves to keep the game within reach, including one on a penalty shot against Pavel Bure, and Leetch picked up a goal and three assists as the Rangers won 4–2 to take a commanding 3–1 series lead.

Game five

Most who entered Madison Square Garden for the fifth game thought they were going to see the Rangers win the Cup that night. New York had already set the date for a victory parade. However, the celebration plans got ahead of the work at hand. The Canucks were leading 3–0 by the third minute of the third period. Even though the Rangers scrambled to pull even by the midway point, Vancouver took the lead 29 seconds later on a goal by Dave Babych and cruised to a 6–3 win.

Game six

The Canucks fired 14 shots at Mike Richter in the first period and led 1–0 on a Jeff Brown bullet from the point. The score was 2–1 after two periods before another Brown goal gave the Canucks a 3–1 third-period lead. Late in the third, Geoff Courtnall appeared to score for the Canucks, but the play continued and the Rangers scored to temporarily make the score 3–2. But, in the ensuing video review, it was confirmed that Courtnall had indeed scored his second goal of the game to clinch the game for the Canucks and force a seventh game, the first in the finals since 1987.

Game seven

For the second time since  and the tenth time overall, the Finals went to seven games. Rangers coach Mike Keenan became the first person to be a head coach in game sevens of the Stanley Cup Finals for two different teams. Keenan had coached the Philadelphia Flyers in  when they lost to the Edmonton Oilers.

The game at Madison Square Garden was an "electric affair" with the Rangers jumping to an early 2–0 lead at the 15-minute mark after scoring twice within four minutes. The Rangers opened the scoring when Sergei Zubov found Brian Leetch, who was wide open after Adam Graves set a pick on Vancouver defender Dave Babych.

The Rangers' next goal was in large part the result of their hard work in the offensive zone, which had caused a penalty against Vancouver. The goal was scored by Adam Graves and assisted by Alexei Kovalev and Zubov, just as the Rangers were regaining the zone after the Canucks had cleared the puck for the first time in that powerplay.

Vancouver's best scoring chances came late in the period on wrist shots by Greg Adams and Pavel Bure, which occurred in the same sequence. Adams' attempt went wide after being deflected by Mike Richter and Bure's required a goalie-like effort from Jeff Beukeboom to keep the Canucks off the scoreboard.

However, Canucks captain Trevor Linden silenced the home crowd with a short-handed goal early in the second period. Uncovered in the neutral zone because he had just come off the bench on a delayed penalty against the Rangers, Linden scored to cut the Canucks' deficit to 2–1. Then, at the midway point of the game, Linden, who had scored only one goal in the first six games, came close to scoring again but was stopped by Mike Richter on a kick save.

With six-and-a-half minutes remaining in the second period, Mark Messier scored a third Ranger goal, which again came on a powerplay that was the result of a penalty drawn by the Rangers' aggressive forecheck. The Canucks were close to finding an answer, though, but Mike Richter denied Cliff Ronning on a rebound chance with a spectacular feet-first pad save to keep the Rangers' lead at 3–1.

Following close-range chances by Brian Noonan and Messier, the Rangers seemed to have taken control of the game, only to have Linden make it close again with a goal early in the third: After a penalty drawn by Bure, Linden converted on a tic-tac-toe play with Ronning and Geoff Courtnall to cut the Canucks' deficit to 3–2. 

After that, it was "hectic, jittery hockey", during which the Canucks twice came close to tying the game. First, Martin Gelinas seemed to have beaten Richter on a three-on-two, but his shot hit the goal post and then deflected off the Rangers' goaltender and had to be cleared by Kevin Lowe. Just 40 seconds later, Nathan LaFayette "frightened all Manhattan wobbling a loose puck" off the post behind Mike Richter with five minutes left. 

In the final 37 seconds, which, due to two clock reviews, took almost seven minutes of real time to be played, there were three face-offs in the New York end. That included a final stoppage with just 1.6 seconds left in the game, which, however, only delayed what at that point seemed inevitable: the Rangers winning their first Stanley Cup in 54 years.

At the time Messier was credited for the game-winning goal earning him the tongue-in-cheek nickname of "Mr. June", however, Messier admitted in 2017 that the game-winning goal was likely scored by Brian Noonan.

Television
In Canada, the series was televised in English on the CBC and in French on SRC. In the United States, the series was broadcast on ESPN. However, ESPN was blacked out in the New York City market because of the MSG Network's local rights to the Rangers games. This was the last Cup Finals in which the regional rights holders of the participating U.S. teams produced local telecasts of their respective games. This was also the last Cup Finals to air exclusively on a cable network until 2023, when TNT will air the Finals for the first time ever. Under the American TV contracts that would take effect beginning next season, there would be exclusive national coverage of the Cup Finals, split between Fox Sports and ESPN.

ESPN also sent its broadcasts to a record 120 countries, for a potential audience of 285 million. MSG Network broadcaster Al Trautwig said that the Rangers themselves contributed to those numbers in putting the first Russian names on the Stanley Cup: Alexander Karpovtsev, Alexei Kovalev, Sergei Nemchinov, and Sergei Zubov, giving a huge European audience, including those watching on the brand-new television screens across the former Soviet Union, a Stanley Cup story to remember.

Ratings
In the United States, game seven was the highest-rated hockey game on cable. ESPN's broadcast drew a 5.2 rating. However, in New York, the ESPN blackout meant MSG Network's broadcast drew 16.2 rating, a record for the network. The two networks combined yielded a 6.9 rating.

With an average Canadian audience of 4.957 million viewers, game seven was the most watched CBC Sports program until the 10.6 million viewers for the men's ice hockey gold medal game between Canada and the United States at the 2002 Winter Olympics, when Canada won its first Olympic ice hockey gold medal since the 1952 Winter Olympics. Bob Cole, who called both games, said that game seven was one of his most memorable TV games.

Team rosters
Bolded years under Finals appearance indicates a year the player won the Stanley Cup.

New York Rangers

Vancouver Canucks

Stanley Cup engraving
The 1994 Stanley Cup was presented to Rangers captain Mark Messier by NHL Commissioner Gary Bettman following the Rangers 3–2 win over the Canucks in game seven

The following Rangers players and staff had their names engraved on the Stanley Cup

1993–94 New York Rangers

See also
1993–94 NHL season
1993–94 New York Rangers season
1993–94 Vancouver Canucks season
1994 Stanley Cup playoffs
List of Stanley Cup champions
1994 Vancouver Stanley Cup riot

References
Inline citations

Bibliography

Stanley Cup
New York Rangers games
Vancouver Canucks games
Stanley Cup Finals
Finals
Stanley Cup Finals
Stanley Cup Finals
1990s in Vancouver
1990s in Manhattan
Stanley Cup Finals
Stanley Cup Finals
Stanley Cup Finals
Stanley Cup Finals
Ice hockey competitions in New York City
Madison Square Garden